Oreille may refer to:

 Ear, the organ of hearing
 Alain Oreille (born 1953), a French Rallye driver
 Oreille River, a tributary of the Blondeau River in Quebec, Canada

See also
 Pend Oreille (disambiguation)